Shady Spring High School is a high school in Shady Spring, West Virginia, which is a suburb of Beckley, West Virginia, including the gated community of Glade Springs, West Virginia. It is managed by the Raleigh County School District. 

The school has 814 students, placing it in class "AA" for sports purposes in the state.  The colors are navy blue and old gold, and the mascot is the "Tigers", although the girls' teams have sometimes used "Lady Tigers" as well.

Sports
Shady Spring High School has numerous sports teams including baseball, softball, soccer, football, golf, cross country, track and field, cheerleading, dance team, archery, tennis, volleyball and wrestling. Several have won state team championships including:
Cross Country- 1 State Championship team and 2 state runner-up teams
Golf- One State Championship team and one individual state champion
Volleyball - 6 State Championship teams and 5 State runner-up teams
Boys Basketball - 1 State Championship team and 1 state runner-up team
Girls Basketball - 1 State Championship team
Wrestling - 5 State Championship Teams, 2 State runner-up teams, 33 individual state champions, 32 individual state runner-ups, 170 state top 6 place finishers, 4 National Wrestling Hall of Fame inductees
Baseball - 2 State runner-up teams
Softball - 6 State championship teams

Notable alumni
 Steven C. Johnson (born 1960), Maryland state delegate

References

External links
 

Public high schools in West Virginia
Buildings and structures in Raleigh County, West Virginia
Education in Raleigh County, West Virginia